Brem-sur-Mer (literally Brem on Sea) is a commune in the Vendée département in the Pays de la Loire region in western France.

It was created in 1974 by the merger of the former communes of Saint Martin-de-Brem and Saint Nicolas-de-Brem.

The commune is a beach resort on the Atlantic Ocean (sur-mer means "on-sea"); "Brem" is derived in etymology from the Gaulish "bram".

Demography

Economy
The main activity of the commune is tourism. It has an industrial area with fourteen companies. It is also known for its vineyard, planted during the Middle Ages by monks.

Twinning
Brem-sur-Mer is a twinned with  Mammendorf, Germany.

See also
Communes of the Vendée department

References

External links

 Commune website (in French)
 Tourist website

Communes of Vendée
Populated coastal places in France